Raphael Saadiq (born Charles Ray Wiggins; May 14, 1966) is an American singer, songwriter, multi-instrumentalist, and record producer. He rose to fame as a member of the multiplatinum group Tony! Toni! Toné! In addition to his solo and group career, he has also produced songs for such artists as Erykah Badu, Jill Scott, Stevie Wonder, Joss Stone, D'Angelo, TLC, En Vogue, Kelis, Mary J. Blige, Ledisi, Whitney Houston, Solange Knowles and John Legend. Music critic Robert Christgau has called Saadiq the "preeminent R&B artist of the '90s".

Saadiq was also a member of The Ummah, a music production collective, alongside D'Angelo, Q-Tip, Ali Shaheed Muhammad, and J Dilla; and was a member of the supergroup Lucy Pearl with Dawn Robinson. He has released five solo albums, including the critically acclaimed retro-styled The Way I See It (2008) and Stone Rollin' (2011). The more contemporary-sounding Jimmy Lee was released in 2019, and earned Saadiq further acclaim.

He is also co-founder of the independent video game developer IllFonic, which developed Friday the 13th: The Game. As a songwriter Saadiq has received two Grammy Awards, two Golden Globe Award nominations and an Academy Award nomination.

Early life
Saadiq was born in Oakland, California, and was the second-youngest of 14 siblings. He attended Castlemont High School. Saadiq states that he does not want his music to be reflective of the tragedies he experienced, saying that "And through all of that I was makin' records, but it wasn't comin' out in the music. I did it to kinda show people you can have some real tough things happen in your life, but you don't have to wear it on your sleeve."

He has been playing the bass guitar since the age of six, and first began singing at age nine in a local gospel group. At the age of 12, he joined a group called "The Gospel Humminbirds". In 1984, shortly before his 18th birthday, Saadiq heard about tryouts in San Francisco for Sheila E.'s backing band on Prince's Parade Tour. At the audition, he chose the name "Raphael", and had difficulty remembering to respond to the name when he heard that he got the part to play bass in the band. He says of the experience, "Next thing I was in Tokyo, in a stadium, singin' Erotic City. We were in huge venues with the biggest sound systems in the world; all these roadies throwin' me basses, and a bunch of models hangin' round Prince to party. For almost two years. That was my university."

Career

1987–1999: Tony! Toni! Toné! and The Ummah

After returning to Oakland from touring with Prince, Saadiq began his professional career as the lead vocalist and bassist in the rhythm and blues and dance trio Tony! Toni! Toné! He used the name Raphael Wiggins while in Tony! Toni! Toné!, along with his brother Dwayne Wiggins, and his cousin Timothy Christian. In the mid-1990s, he adopted the last name Saadiq, which means "man of his word" in Arabic. His change of surname led many to speculate that he had converted to Islam at that point; in reality, Saadiq is not a Muslim, but rather just liked the way "Saadiq" sounded and changed his last name simply to distinguish himself from and avoid potential confusion with his brother, Dwayne Wiggins. As he confirmed by telling noted R&B writer Pete Lewis of the award-winning 'Blues & Soul' in May 2009, "I just wanted to have my own identity!"

In 1995, Saadiq had his biggest solo hit to date, when "Ask of You", featured on the Higher Learning Soundtrack peaked at #19 on the Billboard Hot 100 and #2 on the R&B chart. In 1995, Saadiq produced and performed on Otis & Shug's debut album, We Can Do Whatever.

Tony! Toni! Toné! would become major R&B superstars throughout the late 1980s and 1990s. However, after the 1996 album entitled House of Music failed to duplicate the group's previous success, Tony! Toni! Toné! went their separate ways in 1997.

1999–2004: Lucy Pearl and first string of solo albums

In 1999, Saadiq's next big project became the R&B supergroup Lucy Pearl. He recorded the self-titled album with Dawn Robinson (En Vogue) and Ali Shaheed Muhammad (A Tribe Called Quest). The group only lasted for one album.

Also in 1999, he collaborated with rapper Q-Tip on the single "Get Involved", from the animated television series The PJs. It samples The Intruders' 1973 song "I'll Always Love My Mama" and charted at number 21 on the US Hot R&B/Hip-Hop Singles & Tracks.

His 2000 song collaboration "Untitled (How Does It Feel)" won D'Angelo a Grammy Award for Best Male R&B Vocal Performance; it was also nominated for Grammy Award for Best R&B Song. The song was ranked #4 on Rolling Stone'''s "End of Year Critics & Readers Poll" of the top singles of 2000. D'Angelo's album Voodoo won a Grammy Award for Best R&B Album at the 2001 Grammy Awards.

In 2002, Saadiq founded his own record label, Pookie Entertainment. Among the artists on the label are Joi and Truth Hurts. In 2002, he released his first solo album Instant Vintage, which earned him three Grammy Award nominations in addition to another two Grammy nominations for his writing work on “Love of My Life (An Ode to Hip-Hop)” the following year. He released a two-disc live album All the Hits at the House of Blues in 2003, and his second studio album Ray Ray in 2004, both on Pookie Entertainment.

2004–2010: Expanded output and second string of albums

In 2004, Saadiq produced a remix of the song "Crooked Nigga Too" by Tupac Shakur, which is featured on the album Loyal to the Game. Other artists he has collaborated with include Whitney Houston, Mary J. Blige, The Isley Brothers, A Tribe Called Quest, Teedra Moses, The Roots, Erykah Badu, Jill Scott, Macy Gray, Angie Stone, Snoop Dogg, Mac Dre, Devin the Dude, DJ Quik, Kelis, Q-Tip, Lil' Skeeter, Ludacris, The Bee Gees, Musiq Soulchild, Jaguar Wright, Chanté Moore, Lionel Richie, Marcus Miller, Noel Gourdin, Nappy Roots, Calvin Richardson, T-Boz from TLC, Jody Watley, Floetry, Leela James, Amp Fiddler, John Legend, Joss Stone, Young Bellz, Anthony Hamilton, Babyface, Ledisi, Goapele, Ghostface Killah, —Ginuwine, The Grouch Stevie Wonder, Earth, Wind & Fire, Bilal, Chali 2na, Larry Graham, Luniz as well as many others. In 2007, Saadiq produced Introducing Joss Stone, the third album of British soul singer Joss Stone. According to J. Gabriel Boylan of The New York Observer, "he's produced artists including Macy Gray, the Roots, D'Angelo, John Legend, Whitney Houston, Mary J. Blige, and more. With all of them he's pushed a classic aesthetic, heavy on organic sounds and light on studio magic, deeply indebted to the past and distrustful of easy formulas."

Saadiq's third solo album, The Way I See It, released on Columbia Records on September 16, 2008, available in a collector's edition box set of 7" 45 rpm singles as well as on traditional CD, was critically well-received, made several critics' 2008 best albums lists, and garnered three Grammy nominations including Best R&B Performance by a Duo Or Group With Vocals (for "Never Give You Up", featuring Stevie Wonder & CJ Hilton); Best Traditional R&B Vocal Performance (for "Love That Girl") and Best R&B Album for The Way I See It. Music from The Way I See It was featured in the following motion pictures: Madea Goes To Jail, Bride Wars, Cadillac Records, Secret Life of Bees, In Fighting (Rogue), and It's Complicated.

Touring with a nine piece band, Saadiq hit the 2009 summer music festival circuit with performances at Bonnaroo, Hollywood Bowl, Outside Lands, Pori Jazz, Stockholm Jazz Festival, North Sea Jazz, Essence Music Festival, Summer Spirit Festival, and Nice Jazz Festival, Bumbershoot Music Festival and Austin City Limits. Saadiq has been touring Europe extensively, and held a five-night residency at the House of Blues in Tokyo, Japan, in June 2009. In 2008, Saadiq formed a new label called Velma Records, a place where he promises "people can express themselves like I did with The Way I See It... where they can dream something up and just go with it".

He produced songs for LeToya Luckett's forthcoming second album Lady Love, released August 2009. In 2009, Saadiq produced "Please Stay" and "Love Never Changes" for Ledisi's August 2009 release "Turn Me Loose". Saadiq also was the executive producer for an emerging group called Tha Boogie. Tha Boogie's first EP was released on iTunes and is titled Love Tha Boogie, Vol. 1 (Steal This Sh*t).

In 2009, Saadiq announced his video game development company called IllFonic. The first video game in development by IllFonic is titled Ghetto Golf, with an expected release late in 2010. In 2009, Saadiq teamed up Bentley Kyle Evans, Jeff Franklin, Martin Lawrence, and Trenten Gumbs to create a new sitcom called Love That Girl! starring Tatyana Ali. Raphael is an executive producer and composer for Love That Girl! The show airs on TV One and debuted on January 19, 2010. That same year, Saadiq performed The Spinners hit "It's A Shame" in a legendary Levi's commercial and sang as part of the chorus in the 2010 remake of "We Are the World" for Haiti.

===2011–present: Stone Rollin', Jimmy Lee and other work===

In 2011, Saadiq was the guitarist/bandleader for the group backing Mick Jagger for Jagger's tribute performance of the Solomon Burke R&B classic, "Everybody Needs Somebody to Love" at the 53rd Grammy Awards in Los Angeles and on CBS. The band that accompanied the performance was Saadiq's touring band called Stone Rollin. In 2011 he and his band performed as the ESPY's house band for the night, where he performed his latest compositions.

Saadiq's 2011 album Stone Rollin' was released to great critical acclaim. "He's always had a boyish enthusiasm for performing, and a flexible, naturally joyous voice that suggests a young Stevie Wonder," wrote Greg Kot of the Chicago Tribune, "but with his latest album, Saadiq finds a new gear. The album and his current tour demonstrate that there's a big difference between retro and classic, and the artist consistently finds himself on the right side of that divide." Kot ranked the album number seven in his year-end list, in which he dubbed it Saadiq's "finest achievement" and stated, "He's always written songs steeped in soul and R&B, but now he gives them a progressive edge with roaming bass lines and haunted keyboard textures. He's no longer a retro stylist – he's writing new classics." Critic Jim Derogatis called it "a stone cold gas of a party disc."

In fall 2011, he performed on the fourth results show of Dancing with the Stars season 13. In December 2011, he performed a cover compilation of several Neil Diamond songs at the Kennedy Center Honors award ceremony.

In 2012 he signed a deal with Toyota to do a TV commercial for the Toyota Prius. In 2013 Raphael partnered with Bay Area/ Atlanta Production company EL Seven Entertainment/ Republic Records and then-new R&B singer Adrian Marcel and released his first promotional mixtape Raphael Saadiq Presents Adrian Marcel 7 Days of Weak.

Saadiq is a featured bass guitar player on Elton John's 2013 album, The Diving Board.

In 2016 he executive produced Solange Knowles' album, A Seat At The Table, which debuted at number 1 on music charts in the United States. He also guest starred in Luke Cage, where he performs his songs "Good Man" and "Angel" at Harlem's Paradise.

In 2017 he appeared in the award-winning documentary film The American Epic Sessions, directed by Bernard MacMahon, where he recorded the Memphis Jug Band's 1928 song "Stealin' Stealin'". live on the restored first electrical sound recording system from the 1920s. Of recording on the system he said, "it's amazing to just look at how it's built, you know just look at the machine itself. It just has this like magical sound the way that it's built. It's true. It's just the truest sound you could ever get".

In 2017, Saadiq collaborated with Mary J. Blige as a songwriter for the movie Mudbound (2017), for which they both received Academy Award nominations for Best Original Song.

In 2018, he produced the John Legend holiday themed album, A Legendary Christmas.

On August 23, 2019, Saadiq released his fifth album Jimmy Lee, to critical acclaim.

During the COVID-19 pandemic, he released a song on his website called "Rony! Roni! Roné!", as a nod to his group "Tony! Toni! Toné!".

In 2022, Saadiq was credited as a collaborator on multiple songs from Brent Faiyaz's album Wasteland, which debuted at number two on the Billboard 200 chart. Saadiq also collaborated with Beyoncé on her seventh studio album Renaissance for which he received two Grammy award nominations.
Discography

Solo albums
 Instant Vintage (2002)
 Ray Ray (2004)
 The Way I See It (2008)
 Stone Rollin' (2011)
 Jimmy Lee (2019)

With Tony! Toni! Toné!
 Who? (1988)
 The Revival (1990)
 Sons of Soul (1993)
 House of Music (1996)

With Lucy PearlLucy Pearl (2000)

Singles
 "Ask of You" (1995)
 "Can't Get Enough" (Duet with Willie Max, 1998)
 "Get Involved" (Duet with Q-Tip, 1999)
 "Be Here" (Duet with D'Angelo, 2002)
 "Still Ray" (2002)
 "Love That Girl" (2008)
 "Never Give You Up" (With Stevie Wonder & CJ Hilton, 2009)
 "100 Yard Dash" (2009)
 "Staying In Love" (2009)
 "Something Keeps Calling" (2019)

Awards

Academy Awards

|-
|2018
|Mighty River (with Mary J. Blige & Taura Stinson)
|Best Original Song
|
|}

BET Awards

|-
|2009
|Raphael Saadiq
|BET Centric Award
|
|}

Golden Globe Awards

|-
|2018
|Mighty River (with Mary J. Blige)
|rowspan="2"|Best Original Song
|
|-
|2021
|Tigress & Tweed (with Andra Day)
|
|}

Primetime Emmy Awards

|-
|2021
|Lovecraft Country (with Laura Karpman)
|rowspan="2"|Primetime Emmy Award for Outstanding Music Composition for a Series
|

|}

Grammy Awards

|-
|rowspan=2|1994
|rowspan=2|"Anniversary"
|Best R&B Performance by a Duo or Group with Vocals
|
|-
|Best R&B Song
|
|-
|rowspan=2|2001
|"Dance Tonight"
|Best R&B Performance by a Duo or Group with Vocal
|
|-
|"Untitled (How Does It Feel)" (performed by D'Angelo)
|Best R&B Song
|
|-
|rowspan=5|2003
|rowspan=2|"Be Here" (with D'Angelo)
|Best Urban/Alternative Performance
|
|-
|rowspan=2|Best R&B Song
|
|-
|rowspan=2|"Love of My Life (An Ode to Hip-Hop)" (as songwriter)
|
|-
|Best Song Written for a Motion Picture, Television or Other Visual Media
|
|-
|Instant Vintage|Best R&B Album
|
|-
|2005
|"Show Me the Way" (with Earth, Wind & Fire)
|Best R&B Performance by a Duo or Group with Vocals
|
|-
|2007
|"I Found My Everything" (with Mary J. Blige)
|Best Traditional R&B Performance
|
|-
|rowspan=3|2009
|"Never Give You Up" (feat. Stevie Wonder and CJ Hilton)
|Best R&B Performance by a Duo or Group with Vocals
|
|-
|The Way I See It|Best R&B Album
|
|-
|"Love That Girl"
|Best Traditional R&B Performance
|
|-
|2012
|"Good Man"
|Best Traditional R&B Performance
|
|-
|2021
|Donda (as producer)
|Album of the Year
|
|-
|rowspan=3|2023
|Renaissance (as producer)
|Album of the Year
|
|-
|Cuff It''
|Best R&B Song
|
|}

Soul Train Music Awards

|-
|2009
|Raphael Saadiq
|Best Male R&B/Soul Artist
|
|-
|2011
|Raphael Saadiq
|Centric Award
|
|-
|2016
|"Cranes In The Sky"
|The Ashford & Simpson Songwriter's Award
|
|}

References

External links

 
 
 The Stone Rollin' Sessions Interview With Raphael Saadiq, co-producer Chuck Brungardt, Taura Stinson & Ron Fonksa Bacon on Soul Jones (July 2011)
 Interview of Raphael Saadiq on SoulRnB.com (June 2011)

 
1966 births
Tony! Toni! Toné!
African-American male singers
American male singer-songwriters
American people of Nigerian descent
American neo soul singers
Columbia Records artists
Grammy Award winners
Living people
Musicians from Oakland, California
American hip hop singers
American contemporary R&B singers
Lucy Pearl members
African-American songwriters
Singer-songwriters from California